Lyndon is an unincorporated community in Ross County, in the U.S. state of Ohio.

History
Lyndon was originally called "Zora", and under the latter name was platted in 1853. The present name is after Lyndon, Massachusetts, the native home of an early settler. A former variant name was Lyndon Station. A post office called Lyndon Station was established in 1857, and the name was changed to Lyndon in 1882. Lyndon Station was located on the Marietta and Cincinnati Railroad.

References

Unincorporated communities in Ross County, Ohio
1853 establishments in Ohio
Unincorporated communities in Ohio